Robert Doull (1828 – December 9, 1906) was a Scottish-born Canadian merchant and political figure. He represented Pictou in the House of Commons of Canada from 1872 to 1874 and from 1878 to 1882 as a Liberal-Conservative member.

He was born in Wick, Caithness-shire, Scotland, the son of John Doull and Jane Craig, and came to Nova Scotia with his parents while still an infant. In 1852, he married Janet Crichton. Doull was a lieutenant-colonel for the Pictou County militia. He served as treasurer for the county for 15 years and was a director of the Pictou Bank. Doull was defeated in 1874 but then ran successfully for a federal seat in 1878. In 1888, he moved to Craven, Northwest Territories.

Electoral history

References 

1828 births
1906 deaths
Conservative Party of Canada (1867–1942) MPs
Members of the House of Commons of Canada from Nova Scotia
Scottish emigrants to Canada